In reptiles, occipital scales are enlarged plates that lie directly behind the parietal scales.

An interoccipital is a scale located between the occipital scales.

Related scales
 Parietal scales.

See also
 Snake scales.

References

Snake scales